Grizel Cochrane is a figure from 17th century Scottish lore. Cochrane's father, John Cochrane of Ochiltree, had been captured following the Monmouth Rebellion against the rule of James VII, in 1685, and was therefore scheduled to be condemned to death. According to the legend, in order to prevent the execution from being carried out, Grizel disguised herself as a man and robbed the postman who carried the death warrant, on a lonely part of Tweedmouth Moor. When initial efforts to seek a pardon were unsuccessful, Grizel robbed the postman a second time fourteen days later, to again stave off the execution. The second robbery provided enough time for the pardon to be secured.

A Scottish ballad titled Cochrane's Bonny Grizzy was written in honor of the account.

External links
 Women of Scotland page on Grizel Cochrane .

References

17th-century Scottish women
Date of birth unknown
Date of death unknown
Year of birth unknown
Year of death unknown
G